Bemersyde Moss is a Scottish Wildlife Trust nature reserve and a Site of Special Scientific Interest at Bemersyde in the Scottish Borders area of Scotland.

See also
Site of Special Scientific Interest
List of Sites of Special Scientific Interest in Berwickshire and Roxburgh
List of Sites of Special Scientific Interest in Tweeddale and Ettrick and Lauderdale
List of places in the Scottish Borders
List of places in Scotland

External links
Scottish Wildlife Trust: Bemersyde Moss
Napier University: Seasonal variations in nutrient levels in Bemersyde Moss
Scottish Natural Heritage: Bemersyde Moss
RCAHMS record of Bemersyde Moss
CANMORE/RCAHMS record for Bemersyde Moss

Nature reserves in Scotland
Sites of Special Scientific Interest in Scotland
Protected areas in the Scottish Borders